New Party was a former Turkish political party.

After Turgut Özal was elected as the President of Turkey, he resigned from the Motherland Party (ANAP) because of constitutional reasons. On 30 November 1992, he was replaced by Mesut Yılmaz. Next day, Yusuf Bozkurt Özal, Turgut Özal's younger brother,  together with a group of deputies resigned from ANAP. On 7 October 1993, Yusuf Bozkurt Özal founded the New Party. However, in the general elections held on 24 December 1995, the party could receive only 0.13% of votes. After this defeat, the party was merged to another party in 1997 November.

References

1993 establishments in Turkey
Political parties disestablished in 1997
1997 disestablishments in Turkey
Defunct conservative parties in Turkey
Liberal conservative parties in Turkey